Maurizio Lanzaro (born 14 March 1982) is an Italian football coach and former player. He is currently in charge as the caretaker of Serie C club Seregno.

Playing career
A central defender, he made his professional debut with AS Roma on a Serie A league game against Piacenza on 9 May 1999. He successively moved to Verona in the Italian top flight, and then went on to Serie B teams Palermo and Cosenza.

He returned in the Italian top flight with Empoli in 2003, and successively with Reggina. In 2010 he then moved to Spain to join then-La Liga club Real Zaragoza. He retired in 2018.

Coaching career
On 28 March 2022, he was named new caretaker of Serie C club Seregno, a club he had joined as a coaching staff member earlier in the summer of 2021, after head coach Alberto Mariani was forced to temporarily relinquish his position due to personal reasons.

References

External links
 
 
 

1982 births
People from Avellino
Footballers from Campania
Living people
Italian footballers
Italy youth international footballers
Italy under-21 international footballers
Association football defenders
A.S. Roma players
Hellas Verona F.C. players
Palermo F.C. players
Cosenza Calcio 1914 players
Empoli F.C. players
U.S. Salernitana 1919 players
Reggina 1914 players
Real Zaragoza players
S.S. Juve Stabia players
Calcio Foggia 1920 players
A.S. Melfi players
SD Ejea players
Serie A players
Serie B players
Serie C players
La Liga players
Italian expatriate footballers
Expatriate footballers in Spain
Italian football managers
Serie C managers
Sportspeople from the Province of Avellino